The People Mover is the public transportation agency that serves metropolitan Anchorage, Alaska. It is owned and operated by the Municipality of Anchorage, with service primarily within city limits as well as Eagle River.

Service
The People Mover bus system includes regular all-day service routes on many of the city's major streets as well as two routes with rush hour-only service (the #91 which serves Old Seward Highway south of the Dimond Center Mall and the #92 which runs nonstop from Downtown to Eagle River). Many routes terminate at the Downtown Transit Center, located at the southeast corner of 6th Avenue and H Street in Downtown Anchorage.

People Mover service for most routes within Anchorage begins at 6 or 7 am and ends at 9 or 10 pm, with some of the major routes running until 11 pm on weekdays (and the Route 40 to the airport and Spenard running until almost 2am on weekdays). On Saturdays, most of the all-day routes begin service at 8 am, and end at 7pm. On Sundays, routes end approximately 1 hour earlier. 

In 2016, the City of Anchorage undertook a study to redesign the service with the aim of providing more frequent service without increasing its public transit budget. This resulted in a proposed plan by late November 2016 for more streamlined routes, with less off-tracking than previously, combined with 15-minute frequencies in the densest parts of the city; service to outlying communities would be curtailed. It was expected that a new schedule could be introduced as early as August 2017, but it actually ended up being implemented October 23rd, 2017. The previous system was designed in 2002, and most routes came once per hour.

Fares

1Students in Anchorage middle and high schools ride free during the academic year with their school ID and all riders under 18 or in school ride for free on Thursdays during the summer.  2Seniors, age 60 and over, must show proof of age, People Mover Half Fare Pass or Medicare Card to qualify. Disabled persons must show People Mover Reduced fare Pass or Medicare Card to qualify. Veterans must obtain Half Fare ID Card.  3Children Under 5 are FREE and must be accompanied by an adult; 3-kid limit.  4UAA students, faculty, and staff must show their current semester WOLFCard to qualify. APU and Charter College students, faculty and staff must show their current semester university ID card.

Former Routes
Prior to 2017, the route system was numbered as follows:

1: Muldoon Transfer Center-Dimond Transit Center.
2: Downtown-Dimond Center via Avenue A/C, 36th Avenue, and Lake Otis Parkway.
3: Centennial Village-Downtown via Northern Lights Blvd.
8: Downtown-Muldoon via Northeast Anchorage.
9: Downtown-Dimond Center via Artic Blvd.
13: Downtown-Muldoon Transfer Center via Chugach Manor and UAA.
15: Downtown-Muldoon via Debar Road.
45: Downtown-ANMC via Mountain View
75: Downtown-Alaska Heritage Center via A/C Street, : ANMC-Chugach  (rush hours)

Transit fleet

Active roster

References

1974 establishments in Alaska
Bus transportation in Alaska
Intermodal transportation authorities in Alaska
Transit agencies in Alaska
Transportation in Anchorage, Alaska